Peter Thomas (20 November 1944 – 19 January 2023) was an English footballer who played as a goalkeeper in England, Ireland and United States. Born in England, he made two international appearances for the Republic of Ireland.

Club career
In 1962, Thomas joined Coventry G.E.C., playing with them until 1966. That year, he played one game for Coventry City. He went on loan to Waterford F.C. in 1967 where he made thirteen appearances. Coventry City transferred him to Waterford in the summer of 1967 and he stayed with the Blues until 1975. Thomas is associated with bringing a new style of goalkeeping to the League of Ireland. He rarely kicked the ball on the offensive, throwing when possible with great accuracy. He also represented the League of Ireland XI and won five league medals and a FAI Cup medal and played in twelve European Cup matches for Waterford.

In 1975, he moved to the United States where he played for the Washington Diplomats of the North American Soccer League. In 1976, he moved to the Utah Golden Spikers of the American Soccer League. He returned to the NASL in 1977 with the Las Vegas Quicksilvers. The Diplomats had traded the rights to Thomas and Gerry Ingram to the Quicksilver in exchange for Peter Silvester in November 1976. He finished his North American career with the Sacramento Gold of the ASL in 1978. In the fall of 1978, he returned to Ireland where he rejoined Waterford F.C.

International career
Born in England, Thomas earned two caps with the Republic of Ireland after becoming an Irish citizen. He made his debut in 1973 against Poland, keeping a clean sheet but having to come off at half time due to a pulled muscle in his stomach. His second cap came against Brazil in 1974. He was back down in the ASL in 1975, this time with the Sacramento Gold.

Managerial career
Thomas took over as manager of Waterford United in August 1988 but resigned in December due to work pressures.

Honours
Waterford United
 League of Ireland: 1967–68, 1968–69, 1969–70, 1971–72, 1972–73
 FAI Cup: 1980

Individual
 SWAI Personality of the Year: 1969–70

See also
 List of Republic of Ireland international footballers born outside the Republic of Ireland

References

External links
NASL stats

1944 births
2023 deaths
Footballers from Coventry
Association football goalkeepers
American Soccer League (1933–1983) players
Coventry City F.C. players
Waterford F.C. players
Galway United F.C. (1937–2011) players
Drogheda United F.C. players
Waterford F.C. managers
League of Ireland managers
League of Ireland players
League of Ireland XI players
Las Vegas Quicksilver players
North American Soccer League (1968–1984) players
Republic of Ireland association footballers
Republic of Ireland expatriate association footballers
Republic of Ireland international footballers
Sacramento Gold (1976–1980) players
Utah Golden Spikers players
Washington Diplomats (NASL) players
English footballers
English expatriate sportspeople in the United States
Expatriate soccer players in the United States
English expatriate footballers
English football managers